Andrel Anthony (born January 7, 2002) is an American football wide receiver for Oklahoma. He previously played college football for Michigan.

Early life and high school career
Anthony played high school football in East Lansing, Michigan. He set the East Lansing High School records for most receiving yards in a season (954 in 2019) and a career (1,971).

College career

Michigan 
Anthony received scholarship offers from Notre Dame, Penn State, Arkansas, Ole Miss, Wisconsin, Michigan State, and Kentucky.  He announced his commitment to the University of Michigan at the end of July 2020. He opted not to play his senior year at East Lansing and to instead enroll early at Michigan.

Against Michigan State on October 30, 2021, he made his first reception at Michigan, a 93-yard completion from Cade McNamara, the second longest pass play in Michigan football history. He ended the game with six catches for 155 yards and two touchdowns. He was subsequently named the Big Ten Co-Freshman of the Week for the week ending November 1, 2021.

As a sophomore in 2022, Anthony caught seven passes for 80 yards and a touchdown.

Oklahoma 
On January 10, 2023, Anthony transferred to Oklahoma.

References

External links
 Michigan Wolverines bio

2002 births
Living people
American football wide receivers
Michigan Wolverines football players
People from Greenwich, Connecticut
Players of American football from Connecticut